Aravind Parameswaran popularly known by his stage name, Chutti Aravind is an Indian actor, mimicry artist and comedian who is currently working in the Tamil film industry, he debuted in the Tamil film Chennai Kadhal in 2006. In 2022, he participated in the popular cooking show Cooku with Comali (season 3) as a contestant in Star Vijay.

Career
Aravind made his acting debut with Chennai Kadhal (2006) directed by Vikraman. After a brief sabbatical, he made his comeback in the 2013 film Oruvar Meethu Iruvar Sainthu playing a supporting role in the film. He was later seen in films such as Jannal Oram (2013), Vaigai Express (2017), Natpe Thunai (2019) and Nenjamundu Nermaiyundu Odu Raja (2019). Aravind also participated in television shows such as Kalakka Povathu Yaaru in 2015. He later joined the cooking show Cooku with Comali (season 3) as a contestant, however he was later eliminated from the show due to poor cooking efforts.

Filmography

Film

Television

References

External links 

21st-century Indian male actors
Living people
Tamil male actors
Indian male film actors
People from Madurai district
Tamil comedians
Indian male comedians
Male actors from Tamil Nadu
Year of birth missing (living people)